Luiz Marinho (born 20 May 1959 in Cosmorama) is a Brazilian politician and unionist. He was minister of Labor and Employment and minister of Social Security in the government of president Luiz Inácio Lula da Silva. He also was mayor of São Bernardo do Campo between 2009 and 2017.

Biography
Marinho is married to Nilza de Oliveira and is the father of two children. Have a Bachelor of Law degree and is a former metalworker in the '70s, when met Lula da Silva. His first and only register in his work permit is from July 1978, when he was hired to work in the painting sector of Volkswagen in São Bernardo do Campo, where he also began his unionist career as member of the Internal Commission of Accidente Prevention (CIPA).

Awards
Among the public acknowledgments, Marinho collects the Highlight of the Year Award of 1999, granted by the magazine Livre Mercado.

Also in 1999, he was appointed by Time/CNN as one of the 50 Latin American Leaders for the New Millennium, because of his negotiations with Volkswagen, which avoided the dismissal of 10,000 workers.

References

External links
 

1959 births
Living people
Government ministers of Brazil
Workers' Party (Brazil) politicians
Brazilian trade unionists
People from São Paulo (state)